is a Japanese politician from the Constitutional Democratic Party (CDP) and a member of the House of Representatives in the Diet (national legislature). Ochiai represents the Tokyo 6th district.

Biography 
Ochiai was born in Setagaya, Tokyo in 1979. After graduating with an economics degree from Keio University, he joined the Sumitomo Mitsui Banking Corporation. He started his foray into politics by working as the main secretary for Diet members Kenji Eda and Kota Matsuda.

He first contested an election in 2012 as the Your Party (YP) candidate for the Tokyo 6th district, finishing fourth at that time. A year later, Ochiai left the party after disagreeing with its policy of supporting the draconian State Secrecy Law pushed by the Abe government. In May 2014, he joined the Unity Party which was formed by anti-State Secrecy Law ex-YP members. The party was then merged into the Japan Innovation Party (JIP) in the same year.

Ochiai recontested Tokyo-6th in the 2014 general election. This time, he lost by a narrower margin than in 2012, thus enabling him to win a Diet seat via his party's proportional representation list. When the JIP merged with the Democratic Partyu of Japan, he joined the post-merger Democratic Party.

As an opponent against amending Article 9 of the Japanese Constitution, Ochiai protested then-DP president Seiji Maehara's decision to join hands with Yuriko Koike's pro-amendment Party of Hope in the imminent 2017 general election. In the ensuing party split, he joined the CDP and contested the Tokyo-6th seat again in the election. He shockingly defeated the LDP incumbent and former vice minister Takao Ochi in the constituency. This would mark the first time Ochiai won a constituency seat.

Personal life 
Ochiai is married to Kumiko Horiuchi. They live in a rented apartment in Setagaya along with their two children.

Ochiai's role models are Shusei Tanaka and Mahatma Gandhi.

References

External links 
 Official website in Japanese.

1979 births
Living people
Members of the House of Representatives from Tokyo
People from Setagaya
People from Tokyo
Politicians from Tokyo
Constitutional Democratic Party of Japan politicians
Democratic Party of Japan politicians
21st-century Japanese politicians